Phut or Put ( Pūṭ; Septuagint Greek  Phoud) is the third son of Ham (one of the sons of Noah), in the biblical Table of Nations (Genesis ; cf. 1 Chronicles ). The name Put (or Phut) is used in the Bible for Ancient Libya, but a few scholars proposed the Land of Punt known from Ancient Egyptian annals.

Historical records
Epiphanius writes: "Thus Mistrem was allotted Egypt, Cush Ethiopia, Put Axum, Ragman and Sabteka and [Dedan, also called Judad], the region bordering on Garama."

Josephus writes: "Phut also was the founder of Libya, and called the inhabitants Phutites (Phoutes), from himself: there is also a river in the country of Moors which bears that name; whence it is that we may see the greatest part of the Grecian historiographers mention that river and the adjoining country by the appellation of Phut (Phoute): but the name it has now has been by change given it from one of the sons of Mezraim, who was called Lybyos." Pliny the Elder and Ptolemy both place the river Phuth on the west side of Mauretania (modern Morocco). Ptolemy also mentions a city Putea in Libya (iv.3.39).

A Libyan connection has likewise been inferred from Nahum , where it is said that "Put and Lubim" were the helpers of Egypt. Other biblical verses consistently refer to the descendants of Put as warriors. In , they are again described as being supporters of Egypt. The Septuagint Greek (LXX) substitutes Libues in Ezekiel where the Hebrew Bible refers to Put.

The Libyan tribe of pỉdw shows up in Egyptian records by the 22nd dynasty, while a Ptolemaic text from Edfu refers to the t3 n nꜣ pỉt.w "the land of the Pitu". The word was later written in Demotic as Pỉt, and as Phaiat in Coptic, a name for Libya Aegypti, northwestern Egypt.

A fragment of Nebuchadnezzar II's annals mentions his campaign in 567 in Egypt, and defeating the soldiers of Pu-ṭu-ia-a-man, i.e. Greek Libya (Cyrene). A multilingual stele from al-Kabrīt, dating to the reign of Darius I refers to the Put as the province of Putāya (Old Persian) and Puṭa (Neo-Babylonian), where the equivalent text written in Egyptian has tꜣ ṯmḥw "Libya".

See also
 Hamitic
Putāya (satrapy)

References

Bibliography
 Baker, David W. 1992. "Put". In The Anchor Bible Dictionary, edited by David Noel Freedman. Vol. 5 of 6 vols. New York: Doubleday. 560
 Graefe, Erhart. 1975. "Der libysche Stammesname p(j)d(j)/pjt im spätzeitlichen Onomastikon." Enchoria: Zeitschrift für Demotistik und Koptologie 5:13–17.

Children of Ham (son of Noah)
Hebrew Bible nations
Book of Genesis people
Noach (parashah)
Land of Punt